Bruce Vawter (1921–1 December 1986) was a Vincentian priest and a biblical scholar.

Biography

Vawter was born in 1921 at Fort Worth, and joined the Vincentians in 1942. He was ordained in 1947. Vawter received his doctorate in sacred Scripture from the Pontifical Biblical Institute in Rome, and then was a Fulbright scholar at Eberhard University in Tübingen, West Germany.

Vawter was chairman of De Paul University's department of religious studies from 1969 until June 1986.

Vawter was a witness in the 1981 Creationism trial, reported as McLean v. Arkansas, at Little Rock, Arkansas.

Vawter died on 1 December 1986.

Works
Vawter authored more than a dozen works.

As author
 Job and Jonah
 The Path of Wisdom
 Amos, Hosea, Micah: With an Introduction to Classical Prophecy
 On Genesis
 This Man Jesus
 The four Gospels
 Biblical Inspiration

As editor
all the work issued by the Catholic Biblical Association of America
 Old Testament Abstracts

References

1921 births
1986 deaths
Vincentians
Catholic clergy scientists
Roman Catholic biblical scholars
Roman Catholic missionaries in the United States
Canonical theologians
Pontifical Biblical Institute alumni
American male writers
20th-century male writers
United States creationism and evolution case law
20th-century American Roman Catholic priests
American expatriates in Italy
American expatriates in Germany